Sorokoba is a village in Bulu District, Ba Province, Fiji.

References

Populated places in Fiji